Magomed Abuyazidovich Mitrishev (born 10 September 1992) is a Russian professional football player of Chechen origin who plays as a forward, attacking midfielder or winger.

Club career
Mitrishev made his professional debut for PFC Spartak Nalchik on 28 November 2010 in a Russian Premier League game against FC Anzhi Makhachkala. He came on as a substitute in the 71st minute and scored a goal a minute later.

On 5 August 2020, Mitrishev joined Chayka Peschanokopskoye on loan for the 2020–21 season.

Career statistics

Club

References

External links
 
 

1992 births
Sportspeople from Grozny
Russian people of Chechen descent
Living people
Russia youth international footballers
Russia under-21 international footballers
Russian footballers
Association football forwards
PFC Spartak Nalchik players
FC Akhmat Grozny players
FC Anzhi Makhachkala players
FC Chayka Peschanokopskoye players
FC Veles Moscow players
Russian Premier League players
Russian First League players